F.T.F.O. (an acronym for Fuck The Fuck Off) is the debut solo studio album by American rapper Shaggy 2 Dope. It was released on February 21, 2006 via Psychopathic Records. Recording sessions took place at the Lotus Pod in Detroit and at the Funhouse Studio in Sterling Heights, Michigan. Production was handled by Insane Clown Posse, Mike E. Clark, Polar Bear and Fritz the Cat. It features guest appearance from Twiztid. The album art alludes to the ICP tradition of spraying the audience (and themselves) with the American soft drink Faygo.

The album debuted at No. 88 on the Billboard 200, No. 24 on the Top Rock Albums, No. 7 on the Independent Albums and No. 11 on the Tastemakers with nearly 14,000 copies sold in its first week in the United States.

Track listing

Personnel
Joseph "Shaggy 2 Dope" Utsler – lyrics, lead vocals, producer (tracks: 1, 2, 5, 12, 14, 16)
Paul "Monoxide" Methric – lyrics & vocals (track 10)
James "Jamie Madrox" Spaniolo – lyrics & vocals (track 10)
Joseph "Violent J" Bruce – lyrics (tracks: 1, 2, 4, 6, 7, 8, 9, 11, 13, 17), additional vocals (tracks: 2, 4, 7, 8, 9, 11, 13, 15, 17), producer (tracks: 1, 7, 13)
James "Lavel" Hicks – additional vocals (tracks: 3, 7, 13), engineering (tracks: 1, 3, 4, 6-8, 12-17)
Chris "Blaze Ya Dead Homie" Rouleau – additional vocals (tracks: 4, 10)
Michelle "Sugar Slam" Rapp – additional vocals (track 13)
James "Anybody Killa" Lowery – additional vocals (track 14)
Annette Utsler – additional vocals (track 14)
Mike E. Clark – producer (tracks: 4, 6, 9, 10, 11, 15), engineering (track 10), mixing
Polar Bear – producer (tracks: 3, 8)
Fritz "The Cat" Vankosky – additional producer (tracks: 5, 14), engineering (tracks: 2, 5, 9, 10, 11)
Brian Debler – graphics
Michael Scotta – graphics

Charts

References

External links

2006 debut albums
Shaggy 2 Dope albums
Psychopathic Records albums
Albums produced by Joseph Bruce
Albums produced by Mike E. Clark